A Will to Survive is the 156th title of the Hardy Boys series, written by Franklin W. Dixon.  The book was first published by Pocket Books in 1999, and reprinted by Scholastic in 2004.

Plot summary
The Hardy Boys go to Shorewood Nature Center, an ecology system.  The Hardy Boys then find out of a valuable treasure stored in the center.  But someone is trying to get rid of them.  Now the Hardy Boys must find out the stalker before it's too late.  The young lads get into many dangers and at last they get the mystery solved.

References

Sources

The Hardy Boys books
1999 American novels
1999 children's books
Pocket Books books